Wladimiro "Tony" de Tommaso (born 1 February 1951) is an Italian former racing driver from Brindisi.

De Tommaso began his career in regional rally racing in the late 1970s. He competed in the Italian Formula Three Championship from 1981 to 1983 without a podium finish. He returned to racing in 1988 to race in International Formula 3000 but in three attempts he failed to qualify for any races so for 1989 he returned to Italian F3 for two races. In 1991 he attempted to make his CART World Series debut in Denver but he failed to qualify. The following year he qualified for the CART race at Laguna Seca Raceway but crashed out 48 laps into the 84 lap event. He is now a racing instructor in Italy.

Racing career

Complete International Formula 3000 results
(key) (Races in bold indicate pole position; races in italics indicate fastest lap.)

Complete CART/Indycar results

References

1951 births
Living people
Italian racing drivers
Italian Formula Three Championship drivers
FIA European Formula 3 Championship drivers
Champ Car drivers
People from Brindisi
Sportspeople from the Province of Brindisi

EuroInternational drivers